The 1898 Lehigh football team was an American football team that represented Lehigh University as an independent during the 1898 college football season. In its first season under head coach Samuel Huston Thompson, the team compiled a 3–6–1 record and was outscored by a total of 106 to 49.

Schedule

References

Lehigh
Lehigh Mountain Hawks football seasons
Lehigh football